This is a list of the laws and acts passed by the Western Cape Provincial Parliament, the legislature of the Western Cape province of South Africa. From 1994 to 1997 the parliament's enactments were known as "Laws"; since then they have been called "Acts".

1994

1995

1996

1997

1998

1999

2000

2001

2002

2003

2004

2005

2006

2007

2008

2009

2010

2011

2012

2013

2014

2015

2016

2017

2018

2019

2020

References 
 

Acts
Western Cape